The Spenserian sonnet is a sonnet form named for the poet Edmund Spenser.

A Spenserian sonnet comprises three interlocked quatrains and a final couplet, with the rhyme scheme ABAB BCBC CDCD EE.

Three prominent features of this sonnet type were known already: Italian and French sonnets used five rhymes; sonnets of Thomas Wyatt and the Earl of Surrey used final couplets; and the interleaved ABAB rhymes were in the English style.

References

External links
A compilation of ten Spenserian sonnets at the online journal of The Society of Classical Poets

Sonnet studies
Edmund Spenser
Scottish poetry